The Chief Scout Award is the highest youth programme award in each of the Programme Sections in Scouting Ireland. It is designed to tie-in with the Gaisce Award/Duke of Edinburgh's Award, and the Chief Scout Award for Scouts, Venture Scouts, and Rover Scouts are awarded jointly with the Bronze, Silver and Gold awards respectively. Requirements for the award are a number of Adventure Skills, Special Interest Badges, an Expedition, and camp with an inter-cultural aspect. The progress of the award is led by the participant, with the help of the Scouter.

A similarly named award, The Chief Scout's Award was the highest award for Scouts in Scouting Ireland until the development of the ONE Programme. The precise criteria for the Chief Scout's Award in Scouting Ireland as a result of the merger of CSI and SAI are unclear at present . It is the final step in the personal progressive scheme of the former CSI. The SAI used it as an award to be achieved in tandem with the progressive badge scheme.

The Chief Scout's Award is an individual recognition of commitment to the Scout Law, dedication to attain personal ambitions and the desire to contribute to and to improve society. Chief Scout's Award holders have often been received at Áras an Uachtaráin by the President of Ireland, most recently in 2004 by Mary McAleese, who is the Patron of Scouting Ireland. It is estimated that about 1 in 300 Scouts achieve the award, giving it the name; "1 in 300 award" The first recipient was William Cronin, 1st/4th Tipperary (Clonmel), .

History of the Chief Scout's Award
The award was introduced by Catholic Boy Scouts of Ireland in the early 1960s to replace the Silver Palm Award. The first awards were presented by Chief Scout CJ "Kit" Murphy.

Scouting Ireland S.A.I. also awarded a Chief Scout's Award, with successful applicant receiving a cloth badge, a certificate signed by the Chief Scout, and a special neckerchief on Founder's Day in the Mansion House, Dublin.

Since the foundation of Scouting Ireland, award recipients have been presented with a pendant (See Award section below)

The Chief Scout award is now standardised across the five programme sections Beavers, Cubs, Scouts, Ventures and Rovers.

Requirements
Requirements for the award are a number of Adventure Skills, Special Interest Badges, an Expedition, and camp with an inter-cultural aspect. The progress of the award is led by the participant, with the help of the Scouter. Rover Scouts are presented with their Chief Scout Award/Gold President's Award/Gold DOE Award in an annual ceremony in Trinity College, Dublin.

Chief Scout's Award (1960s-2010s CSI)
On this pathway, Scouts complete a personal project. The Scout meets with the Chief Scout, or his representative, and discusses his or her own interests and a project is derived from the candidate's own individual goals. More often than not the project does not directly relate to Scouting. It always, however, relates to one of the development trails which Scouting identifies as crucial to personal growth and achievement; these being personal, spiritual, physical, emotional, social, intellectual and character development. Projects vary widely, from community projects to local history studies and from putting on exhibitions and shows to raising awareness of charitable causes. Key to this pathway is planning, identifying a goal, endeavouring to attain that goal and finally evaluation of the project as a whole.

Setting the challenges
Scouts with their Scout Leader agree their own challenges in each of the six categories. The challenges are recorded on the form.

The Scout Leader should ensure a suitable Standard Of The Challenges is achieved by verifying that the challenges have been set in accordance with the criteria laid down below and then sign this form before it is sent to National Office.

The standard of the challenges should be relevant to the Scout's ability and the quality of Scouting in the troop, so that they are both challenging and achievable.

Upon registered as a participant in the Award, acknowledgement from the Chief Scout is issued accepting the challenges and stating the Chief Scout's Award registration number. Participants have one year from that date to complete their challenges and submit the completed logbook.

Challenge 1: Expedition
Plan and organise an expedition by foot, bicycle, boat or canoe of at least two nights' duration covering either:
 30 km on foot over open country or
 100 km by bicycle or
 30 km by boat or canoe (coastal, river, canal or lake)

The expedition should be planned under the supervision of the Scout Leader and all safety precautions for the various disciplines must be adhered to.

The expedition may be completed with other members of the troop doing the Chief Scout's Award, but a maximum of three Scouts may count the same expedition as part of their Chief Scout's Award.

Challenge 2: Day Activity
Plan and lead a day activity such as a hike, cycle or boating trip for other members of the troop producing route cards, maps, safety considerations and emergency procedures. The activity should have a novel programme on route, e.g. orienteering, dusk to dawn, historical visit etc.
 Hike 15 km over open country
 Cycle 50 km road or off-road
 Boat / Canoe 10 km river, canal, lake or coastal

Only the planner or organiser may count this towards their Chief Scout's Award.

Challenge 3: Scout Skills
Lead the construction of one of the following items, which have not been constructed before:
 A monkey bridge over a river
 A look-out tower for summer camp
 A classic altar fire with a back boiler
 A classic altar fire with an oven
 A hyperbola gateway for the troop site campsite
 A campsite gateway with look-out tower
 A substantial knot board for the Scout hall
 Build a raft and paddle it over a distance of half a mile
 Construct a full nautical flag pole for the summer camp

Challenge 4: Environment
Undertake an environmental project in the form of an activity, research or survey relevant to the local area or an area in which the troop does most of its Scouting. This could be a campsite, woodland, park area, open land, beach or coastline.

Challenge 5: Personal Challenge
Set a personal challenge, not necessarily part of normal Scouting activities and not part of school work, to achieve during the year completing the Chief Scout's Award. This could be learning a new activity or skill or raising a current interest to a new level. Proficiency must be illustrated in a new interest or progress in an existing one.

Challenge 6: Qualification
Achieve or have achieved one of the following qualifications as part of the Chief Scout's Award:
 Intermediate RLSS Resuscitation Award
 RLSS Bronze Medallion
 Recognised First-Aid Course
 National Safety Association Swimming Level 4
 Intermediate Charge Certificate
 Canoe badge
 Orienteering award
 Other award or proficiency of a programme nature defined by the National Scout or Sea Scout Team or Scout Leader

Assessment of Completed Challenges
The Chief Scout will assess the challenges, once completed, upon presentation of the Scout's logbook.

Insignia

Pendant
The award consists of a Connemara marble pendant with the World Crest embedded and a red rope finished with wooden beads at the end. The wooden beads on many award pendants to this day have swastikas carved in recess, see swastikas and Scouting. It seems that the presence of the carvings depend on the manufacturer.

Prior to 2004 before the merging of CSI and SAI, instead of the World Crest, the beads on the CSI award were embedded with the Cross and Shamrock and it was accompanied by the Chief Scout's Award woggle which bore the insignia of the Chief.

Only the Woodbadge beads and the Order of CúChulainn may be worn around the neck by members. Those who hold the Chief Scout's Award are entitled to wear it for life.

Certificate
A certificate, suitable for framing, was presented at all CSA ceremonies and were signed by the Chief Scout, unlike the certificate for the National Scout Award (the element of the progressive scheme which directly preceded the CSA on the CSI pathway) which was traditionally signed by the Chief Commissioner.

References

External links
 De La Salle Waterford news on Chief Scout's Award Presentations
 Mt Argus Chief Scouts Award holders and details of their projects
 Clare Scouts receiving the award

Scouting Ireland
Scout and Guide awards